The 1979 U.S. Open was the 79th U.S. Open, held June 14–17, at Inverness Club in Toledo, Ohio. Hale Irwin won his second U.S. Open title, two strokes ahead of former champions Jerry Pate and Gary Player.

Hale Irwin, the 1974 champion, held a three-stroke lead over Tom Weiskopf going to the final round. Irwin did not play particularly well, recording bogeys at 11, 14, and 18, and a double-bogey at 17. His final-round 75 tied the post-World War II tournament record for highest final round score by the champion. Jerry Pate, the 1976 champion, began the day five behind Irwin and carded a 72 to finish two back. 1965 champion Gary Player, nine behind at the start of the round, fired a 68 to tie Pate for 2nd. Weiskopf struggled on his way to a 76 and finished in 4th.

During the first round a mini controversy sprung up when Lon Hinkle purposefully hit his tee shot on the par 5 8th hole on to the fairway of hole 17, dramatically shortening the hole by cutting off the dogleg. Hinkle reached the green in two with an iron, two putted for birdie and shared the first-round lead. USGA officials were not pleased by Hinkle's ingenuity and the following morning planted a tree off the side of the 8th tee so that players would not be able to take Hinkle's shortcut again.

Player's runner-up finish was his final top-10 in a U.S. Open. Fred Couples, age 19, played in his first major championship and was low amateur.

This was the fourth U.S. Open at Inverness, which hosted in 1920, 1931, and 1957. It later hosted the PGA Championship in 1986 and 1993.

Course layout

Source:

Lengths of the course for previous major championships:

Past champions in the field

Made the cut

Missed the cut 

Source:

Round summaries

First round
Thursday, June 14, 1979

Second round
Friday, June 15, 1979

Amateurs: Couples (+8), Rassett (+8), Cook (+9), Britton (+11), Clampett (+11), Ogrin (+13), McGough (+16), Gusmus (+18), Inskeep (+21), Kemp (+21), Peddy (+21), Rentz (+21), Clements (+22), Nordling (+24), Taylor (+26), Marrello (WD).

Third round
Saturday, June 16, 1979

Final round
Sunday, June 17, 1979

Amateurs: Fred Couples (+18), John Cook (+20), Joey Rassett (+20).

Scorecard
Final round

Cumulative tournament scores, relative to par
{|class="wikitable" span = 50 style="font-size:85%;
|-
|style="background: Pink;" width=10|
|Birdie
|style="background: PaleGreen;" width=10|
|Bogey
|style="background: Green;" width=10|
|Double bogey
|}
Source:

References

External links
USGA Championship Database
USOpen.com – 1979

U.S. Open (golf)
Golf in Ohio
Sports in Toledo, Ohio
Sports competitions in Ohio
U.S. Open
U.S. Open (golf)
U.S. Open
U.S. Open (golf)